Monte Vista High School is public, comprehensive high school located in Spring Valley, California, and serves 1,960 students in grades nine through twelve. Opened in 1961, Monte Vista is the seventh of twelve high schools built in the Grossmont Union High School District.

Monte Vista High School has been ranked among the top 6000 schools in the nation, coming in at #1147, due in part to its excellent record for AP testing and its steadily increasing Annual Performance Index. Monte Vista has one of the best AP programs in the Grossmont Union District.

Students
Monte Vista's student body is composed of pupils from the following ethnic backgrounds (2015–2016 school year):
American Indian or Alaska Native – 0.1%
Asian – 4.7%
Black – 12.3%
Hispanic – 59.7%
Native Hawaiian or Pacific Islander – 0.8%
White (not Hispanic) – 15.5%
Two or More – 6.9%

Extracurricular activities

Athletics

Monte Vista's athletic teams, the Monarchs, compete in the South League of the Grossmont Conference and the California Interscholastic Federation (CIF) San Diego Section. Monte Vista offers a total of 21 Sports over a span of 3 Athletic seasons.

Fall 
 Football
 Boys water polo
 Girls tennis
 Girls volleyball
 Cross country
 Cheer

Winter 
 Wrestling
 Boys basketball
 Girls basketball
 Boys soccer
 Girls soccer
 Girls water polo
 Academic league

Spring 
 Swim
 Gymnastics
 Baseball
 Golf
 Boys lacrosse
 Girls lacrosse
 Boys tennis
 Boys volleyball
 Softball
 Track

Performing arts

Monte Vista's marching band, the Monarch Brigade is a parade and concert band. Monte Vista's drama program puts forward three shows per year—one entirely student-directed. Monte Vista's dance program puts forward two performances each spring. Monte Vista's choir program competes in several festivals in southern California. Monte Vista is also one of only three high schools in the Grossmont district to offer class piano.

Notable alumni
Nick Cannon, 1998, rapper and actor
Brooks Conrad, 1998, Major League Baseball player
Erika Davies, 1999, American jazz vocalist and actress
Royce Ring, 1999, Major League Baseball player
Fred Stanley, 1966, Major League Baseball player
Tonéx, 1993, gospel singer
Mike Whitmarsh, 1980, professional volleyball player and Olympic silver medalist (1996)
Michael Wiley, 1996, NFL football player

See also
List of high schools in San Diego County, California
List of high schools in California

References

External links
Monte Vista High School

Educational institutions established in 1961
High schools in San Diego County, California
Education in San Diego County, California
Public high schools in California
1961 establishments in California